Emam Safi (also Romanized as Emām Şafī; also known as Emām and Imām Shāfī) is a village in Gazin Rural District, Raghiveh District, Haftgel County, Khuzestan Province, Iran. At the 2006 census, its population was 224, in 32 families.

References 

Populated places in Haftkel County